

List of Desna 2 Chernihiv players

Notable players

 Oleksandr Konopko
 Teymuraz Mchedlishvili
 Andriy Fedorenko
 Illya Shevtsov
 Yuriy Komyahin
 Dmytro Romanenko
 Oleksandr Roshchynskyi
 Tymur Rustamov
 Ihor Pokarynin
 Andriy Slotyuk
 Georgios Ermidis
 Yevheniy Belych
  Eduard Galstyan
 Illya Karavashchenko
 Renat Mochulyak
 Denys Demyanenko
 Danylo Kibalnyk
 Pavlo Shostka
 Maksym Tatarenko
 Igor Samoylenko
 Oleksandr Roshchynskyi
 Pavlo Shostka
 Oleh Davydov
 Viktor Litvin
 Vladimir Matsuta
 Sergey Makarenko
 Bohdan Sheiko
 Oleksiy Pashchenko
 Vladyslav Panko
  Mykola Syrash
  Daniil Davydenko
  Roman Vovk
  Oleksandr Rudenko

References

players